Elections to High Peak Borough Council in Derbyshire, England were held on 7 May 1987. All of the council was up for election and the council stayed under no overall control.

After the election, the composition of the council was:
Conservative 17
Labour 11
SDP-Liberal Alliance 7
Independent 9

Election result

Ward results

References

1987
1987 English local elections
1980s in Derbyshire